Bogaewsky (tr. Bogayevsky) was the name of noble family of Don Cossacks who originated from stanitsa Kamenskaya.

Notable members 
 Afrikan Petrovich Bogaewsky (1872–1934), was a Lieutenant General of Russian Imperial Army and Don Host Ataman.
 Mitrofan Petrovich Bogaewsky (1881–1918), was a Russian writer and historian. Killed by Bolsheviks on April 1, 1918.

References

External links
 Shumkov, A.A., Ryklis, I.G. List of noble families of the Don Cossacks in alphabetical order. VIRD Publ House, Sankt-Peterburg. 2000, 

Don Cossacks noble families
Russian noble families